Monforte de Moyuela is a town and municipality in Aragon, located in the comarca of Jiloca, in the province of Teruel. According to the 2005 census (INE), the municipality has a population of 76 inhabitants, with an area of 47.77 km² and a density of 1.58.

The municipality is 121 kilometres from Teruel, the provincial capital.

References

Municipalities in the Province of Teruel